C.L.I.F. 3 (Courage, Loyalty, Integrity, Fairness, or 警徽天职3) was a police procedural series produced by MediaCorp Singapore in 2014 in collaboration with the Singapore Police Force. It was broadcast from 9 April to 13 May 2014 on free-to-air MediaCorp Channel 8 and consists of 25 episodes. It stars Li Nanxing, Rui En, Qi Yuwu, Joanne Peh, Elvin Ng and Tracy Lee for the third installment of the third series.

Plot
The series continues several story lines from the first and second seasons, but it delves further into the relationships of the characters. Yew Jia (Qi Yuwu) has been promoted a rank. He and his girlfriend, later fiancée, Xin Yi (Joanne Peh), are back together again. Xin Yi has since been transferred to the Traffic Police Department and struggles with post-traumatic stress disorder from her time overseas with the UN after witnessing an incident there. Tze Keat (Rui En) and Lum Thiam (Li Nanxing) are married and the latter has transferred from the Forensics Branch to the Criminal Investigation Department (CID). Kwee Xiang (Elvin Ng) and Xiaoyang (Tracy Lee) return from the first season and it is revealed that they are now with the Traffic Police Department. Fugitive Chan Yin Kwun (Pierre Png), a former psychiatrist and pedophile, returns with a vengeance to settle scores with Lum Thiam.

Cast
The characters names are in both Chinese and dialect (if any) romanization.

Main cast

Supporting cast

Other cast

Cameo appearances

Episodes

Awards & Nominations

Star Awards 2015
C.L.I.F. 3 is nominated for 1 award in the Asian Television Awards 2014. It also earned 10 nominations for 9 awards Star Awards 2015, winning Best Music & Sound Design. The other dramas nominated for Best Drama Series and/or Best Theme Song include Against The Tide, Blessings, The Journey: Tumultuous Times, Three Wishes and World At Your Feet.

Asian Television Award 2014

See also
 When Duty Calls

References

Singapore Chinese dramas
2014 Singaporean television series debuts
2014 Singaporean television series endings
Singapore Police Force
Police procedural television series
Singaporean crime television series
2014 Singaporean television seasons
Channel 8 (Singapore) original programming
C.L.I.F.